My Time is the fifth album by Boz Scaggs, released by Columbia Records in September 1972. "Dinah Flo" was the only single released from the album.

Track listing
All songs written by Boz Scaggs unless noted.

Side One
   "Dinah Flo" - 3:03
   "Slowly in the West" (David Brown) - 3:56
   "Full-Lock Power Slide" - 3:09
   "Old Time Lovin' " (Al Green) - 2:52
   "Might Have to Cry" - 4:03

Side Two
   "Hello My Lover" (Allen Toussaint) - 3:23
   "Freedom for the Stallion" (Allen Toussaint) - 2:32
   "He's a Fool for You" - 3:46
   "We're Gonna Roll" - 2:52
   "My Time" - 2:56

Production

Tracks 1, 2, 5, 6, 8 & 10
 Produced by Boz Scaggs
 Recorded at Muscle Shoals Sound Studios, Sheffield, Alabama.

Tracks 3, 4, 7 & 9
 Produced by Roy Halee and Boz Scaggs
 Recorded at CBS Studios, San Francisco, CA.

Other Credits
 Graphics – Anne Garner
 Photography – Ethan A. Russell

Personnel

Tracks 1, 2, 5, 6, 8 & 10
 Boz Scaggs – vocals, electric guitar
 Pete Carr – electric guitar
 Jimmy Johnson – electric guitar
 Eddie Hinton – acoustic guitar
 Barry Beckett – acoustic piano
 Clayton Ivey – organ, keyboards
 David Hood – bass guitar
 Roger Hawkins – drums
 Charles Chalmers – saxophone, backing vocals
 Sandra Chalmers – backing vocals
 Donna Rhodes – backing vocals

Horns performed by Muscle Shoals Horns

Tracks 3, 4, 7 & 9
 Boz Scaggs – vocals, electric guitar
 Joachim Young – keyboards
 David Brown – bass guitar
 George Rains – drums
 Dorothy Morrison – backing vocals
 Linda Tillery – backing vocals

Horns on "Stallion" and "Old Time Lovin'" by Bob Ferreira, Tom Harrell, Mel Martin and Jim Rothermel. Horns on "We're Gonna Roll" by Jack Scherer and Jules Broussard.

References

External links
My Time lyrics

1972 albums
Boz Scaggs albums
Albums produced by Roy Halee
Columbia Records albums
Albums produced by Boz Scaggs
Albums recorded at Muscle Shoals Sound Studio

tr:My Time